A sun dog is an atmospheric phenomenon.

Sun dog or (Sundog) may also refer to:

Arts and entertainment
 "The Sun Dog", a 1990 novella by Stephen King
 SunDog: Frozen Legacy, a 1984 computer game for the Apple II
 Sun Dogs (2006 film), a documentary by Andrea Stewart
 Sun Dogs (2017 film), a comedy drama by Jennifer Morrison
 Sun Dog, a 1984 novel by Jim Harrison
 The Sun Dogs, a 2013 album by Rose Windows
 Sundog, a book of lyrics curated by songwriter Scott Walker

Companies and organizations
 Arizona Sundogs, a minor-league professional ice hockey team
 Sundog Powerchutes, a defunct Canadian aircraft manufacturer
 Sundog Solar, an American solar energy company
 Sundog Software, a disk compression software developer

See also
 Vädersolstavlan (The Sundog Painting), a Swedish painting